Greek National Road 2 (abbreviated as EO2) is a single carriageway with at-grade intersections, located in the regions of West Macedonia, Central Macedonia and East Macedonia and Thrace. It connects the Albanian border near Florina with the Turkish border near Alexandroupoli. Its section east of Thessaloniki has been replaced by the new A2 (Egnatia Odos) motorway. The section between the Albanian border and Thessaloniki is part of European route E86.

The Greek National Road 2 passes through the following places (west to east):
Florina
Edessa (bypass)
Giannitsa (future bypass)
Thessaloniki
Asprovalta
Kavala
Xanthi
Komotini
Alexandroupoli

2
Roads in Western Macedonia
Roads in Central Macedonia
Roads in Eastern Macedonia and Thrace